Ageratina dendroides is a species of flowering plants in the family Asteraceae. It is found only in Ecuador.
Its natural habitats are subtropical or tropical moist montane forests and subtropical or tropical high-altitude grassland. It is threatened by habitat loss.

Etymology
Ageratina is derived from Greek meaning 'un-aging', in reference to the flowers keeping their color for a long time. This name was used by Dioscorides for a number of different plants.

References

dendroides
Flora of Ecuador
Vulnerable plants
Plants described in 1826
Taxonomy articles created by Polbot